Walter Burd, DCM, was an Anglican bishop in the second quarter of the 20th century.
He was born on 23 February 1888 and educated at Wycliffe College. He served with distinction in the First World War after which he became the  General Secretary of the  Brotherhood of St. Andrew, Canada. Following ordination he was   Rector  of Tisdale and then Rural Dean of Melfort. Later he was  a canon residentiary at St Alban's Cathedral, Prince Albert and then Archdeacon  of the area until his elevation to the episcopate as the Bishop of Saskatchewan in 1933. He resigned in Spring 1939 but died a few months later on 2 August.

References

1888 births
Canadian recipients of the Distinguished Conduct Medal
Anglican Church of Canada archdeacons
Anglican bishops of Saskatchewan
20th-century Anglican Church of Canada bishops
1939 deaths